Ayaka Miyauchi (born 14 June 1983) is a Japanese Nak Muay and kickboxer. She is the current WPMF World Pinweight champion.

She is the former WPMF Japanese Mini Flyweight champion, the former WMC World Mini Flyweight and Pinweight champion, the Patong Stadium and J-Girls champion and the WBC Muaythai Interim Mini Flyweight Champion.

She is currently signed with ONE Championship and is competing in their Super Series events.

Martial arts career
Miyauchi made her professional debut in 2007 during the 2007 CUB☆KICK'S-8 against Tomoko Kurimitsu, when she won a unanimous decision.

In 2008 she entered the J-Girls World Queen Tournament. In the opening round, she defeated Mai, but subsequently lost to Mayumi in the second round of the tournament.

In 2009 Miyauchi entered the J-Girls Challengers Tournament. In the quarter finals she defeated Yuka Okamura, and in the semi final bout won the rematch with Mayumi. She would be stopped in the finals by Erika Kamimura.

Later in the year, she entered the J-Girls Founders Tournament, which she managed to win with unanimous decision victories over Marie Nakanaka, Mai and Junko Yamada.

Little Tiger participated in ONE Championship's Warrior Series, facing Sandra Godvik during Warrior Series 8. Miyauchi lost her debut with the organization by a unanimous decision.

In her next fight with ONE Championship Miyauchi fought Marie Ruumet. Ruumet kept her at distance with a combination of low and middle kicks, as well as through straight punches, leading Rummet to a unanimous decision win.

Championships and accomplishments
J-GIRLS
2009 J-GIRLS Founder Atomweight Championship
World Professional Muaythai Federation
2011 WPMF Japanese Mini Flyweight Championship
One successful title defense 
2013 WPMF World Mini Flyweight Championship
One successful title defense
2016 WPMF World Pinweight Championship
World Muaythai Council
2014 WMC World Mini Flyweight Championship
Patong Stadium
2013 Patong Boxing Stadium Flyweight Championship
World Boxing Council Muaythai
2014 WBC Interim Mini Flyweight Championship

Fight record

|-  bgcolor="#fbb"
| 2020-10-10|| Loss ||align=left| Phayahong Ayothayafightgym || Muay Hardcore || Thailand || Decision  || 3 || 3:00
|-  bgcolor="#fbb"
| 2020-08-21|| Loss ||align=left| Marie Ruumet || ONE Championship: No Surrender 3 || Bangkok, Thailand || Decision (Unanimous)  || 3 || 3:00
|-  bgcolor="#fbb"
| 2019-10-05|| Loss ||align=left| Sandra Godvik || ONE Warrior Series 8 || Tokyo, Japan || Decision (Unanimous)  || 3 || 3:00
|-  bgcolor="#fbb"
| 2018-10-21|| Loss ||align=left| Eguchi Comachi || M-ONE 2018 Final || Tokyo, Japan || Decision (Unanimous)  || 3 || 3:00
|-  bgcolor="#c5d2ea"
| 2017-11-26|| Draw ||align=left| Phayahong RiangkilaKorat  || M-ONE 2017 FINAL || Tokyo, Japan || Decision (Split) || 3 || 3:00
|-  bgcolor="#cfc"
| 2017-09-18|| Win ||align=left| Yodin Sityodin || M-ONE 2017 2nd || Tokyo, Japan || TKO  || 2 || 1:09
|-  bgcolor="#fbb"
| 2017-05-28|| Loss ||align=left| Koto Hiraoka || Krush 76 || Tokyo, Japan || Decision (Unanimous)  || 3 || 3:00
|-  bgcolor="#cfc"
| 2017-03-20|| Win ||align=left| Saomangkon Polamaipaka || M-ONE 2017 1st || Tokyo, Japan || Decision (Unanimous)  || 3 || 3:00
|-  bgcolor="#cfc"
| 2016-11-23|| Win ||align=left| Anan Sit Changseen || `M-ONE 2016 FINAL || Tokyo, Japan || TKO  || 1 || 1:35
|-  bgcolor="#cfc"
| 2016-09-25|| Win ||align=left| Eguchi Comachi || `M-ONE 2016 3rd || Tokyo, Japan || Decision (Unanimous)  || 5 || 3:00
|-
! style=background:white colspan=9 |
|-  bgcolor="#cfc"
| 2016-06-19|| Win ||align=left| MARI || M-ONE 2016 vol.2 || Tokyo, Japan || Decision (Unanimous)  || 3 || 3:00
|-  bgcolor="#fbb"
| 2016-03-21|| Loss ||align=left| Saya Ito || M-ONE || Tokyo, Japan || Decision (Majority)  || 5 || 2:00
|-
! style=background:white colspan=9 |
|-  bgcolor="#fbb"
| 2016-01-17|| Loss ||align=left| Kill Bee || Krush 62 || Tokyo, Japan || Decision (Unanimous)  || 3 || 3:00
|-  bgcolor="#fbb"
| 2015-09-27|| Loss ||align=left| Saya Ito || Suk Weerasakreck 10 || Tokyo, Japan || Decision (Majority)  || 5 || 2:00
|-
! style=background:white colspan=9 |
|-  bgcolor="#fbb"
| 2015-08-11|| Loss ||align=left| Poonsayam || King's Birthday Celebration || Bangkok, Thailand || Decision (Majority)  || 3 || 3:00
|-  bgcolor="#cfc"
| 2015-06-14|| Win ||align=left| Nong Cake LonLianGilaKonkaen || Suk Weerasakreck 9 || Tokyo, Japan || Decision (Majority)  || 5 || 3:00
|-  bgcolor="#cfc"
| 2015-03-22|| Win ||align=left| Nonpaew Por Pitakuchai || WPMF JAPAN × REBELS SUK WEERASAKRECK FAIRTEX || Tokyo, Japan || KO  || 4 || 1:45
|-  bgcolor="#cfc"
| 2014-11-09|| Win ||align=left| MuangTongyu Sohenjarung || Suk Weerasakreck 8 || Tokyo, Japan || KO  || 3 || 1:03
|-  bgcolor="#cfc"
| 2014-09-21|| Win ||align=left| Pettanya Mor Krungtep || ? || Tokyo, Japan || TKO  || 4 || 
|-
! style=background:white colspan=9 |
|-  bgcolor="#cfc"
| 2014-07-26|| Win ||align=left| Faachiangrai Sor. Sakunthong || WBC Championship || Pattaya, Thailand || Decision (Split)  || 5 || 2:00
|-
! style=background:white colspan=9 |
|-  bgcolor="#cfc"
| 2014-06-15|| Win ||align=left| HorKhao SorsaYarn || Suk Weerasakreck 6 || Tokyo, Japan || Decision (Unanimous)  || 3 || 3:00
|-  bgcolor="#cfc"
| 2014-03-30|| Win ||align=left| Pokeo Tonyom Su || Suk Weerasakreck 5 Part 2 || Tokyo, Japan || TKO || 2 || 0:50
|-
! style=background:white colspan=9 |
|-  bgcolor="#cfc"
| 2013-11-17|| Win ||align=left| Pewary Mor Krungthep Thongburi || Suk Weerasakreck 4 Part 2 || Tokyo, Japan || KO || 1 || 0:45
|-  bgcolor="#fbb"
| 2013-10-23|| Loss ||align=left| Tep Sor Sortip Jarun || Suk Weerasakreck 4 Part 2 || Sing Buri Province, Thailand || Decision (Unanimous) || 5 || 2:00
|-
! style=background:white colspan=9 |
|-  bgcolor="#cfc"
| 2013-09-15|| Win ||align=left| Tep Sor Sortip Jarun || Suk Weerasakreck 3 Part 2 || Tokyo, Japan || Decision (Unanimous) || 5 || 2:00
|-
! style=background:white colspan=9 |
|-  bgcolor="#fbb"
| 2013-06-16|| Loss ||align=left| Yoozin Sittmuesayam || Suk Weerasakreck 2 Part 1 || Tokyo, Japan || Decision (Unanimous) || 5 || 2:00
|-
! style=background:white colspan=9 |
|-  bgcolor="#c5d2ea"
| 2013-04-14|| Draw ||align=left| Soissy Porchetta || M-FIGHT BOM I ~The Battle of Muaythai~ || Tokyo, Japan || Decision (Unanimous) || 5 || 3:00
|-  bgcolor="#c5d2ea"
| 2013-03-17|| Draw ||align=left| Payak Muezayam || Ayutthaya Boxing Stadium || Thailand || Decision (Unanimous) || 5 || 2:00
|-
! style=background:white colspan=9 |
|-  bgcolor="#cfc"
| 2013-02-14|| Win ||align=left| Christie || Patong Stadium || Phuket, Thailand || TKO || 3 || 
|-
! style=background:white colspan=9 |
|-  bgcolor="#cfc"
| 2012-12-07|| Win ||align=left| Benafer || Patong Stadium || Sing Buri Province || TKO || 2 ||
|-  bgcolor="#fbb"
| 2012-11-11|| Loss ||align=left| Chiharu || M-1 Sutt Yod Muaythai vol.4 || Tokyo, Japan || Decision (Unanimous)  || 5 || 2:00
|-
! style=background:white colspan=9 |
|-  bgcolor="#cfc"
| 2012-09-09|| Win ||align=left| Jaupachala Motor Sanai || M-1 Muay Thai Challenge Sutt Yod Muaythai vol.3 || Tokyo, Japan || KO  || 4 || 2:00
|-  bgcolor="#cfc"
| 2012-06-24|| Win ||align=left| Teacher Go. Addison || M-1 Muay Thai Challenge Sutt Yod Muaythai vol.2 || Tokyo, Japan || Decision (Unanimous)  || 5 || 2:00
|-  bgcolor="#cfc"
| 2012-04-15|| Win ||align=left| Hyakuhana || Rebels 11 || Tokyo, Japan || Decision (Unanimous)  || 3 || 3:00
|-  bgcolor="#cfc"
| 2012-01-22|| Win ||align=left| Nao Iida || Rebels 10 || Tokyo, Japan || Decision (Majority)  || 5 || 3:00
|-
! style=background:white colspan=9 |
|-  bgcolor="#cfc"
| 2011-12-22|| Win ||align=left| Momi || 2011 Fujiwara Festival -Winter Team- || Tokyo, Japan || Ext.R Decision (Unanimous)  || 4 || 3:00
|-  bgcolor="#fbb"
| 2011-08-28|| Loss ||align=left| Chiharu || 2011 Fujiwara Festival-Summer Team || Tokyo, Japan || Decision (Unanimous)  || 5 || 3:00
|-
! style=background:white colspan=9 |
|-  bgcolor="#cfc"
| 2011-06-12|| Win ||align=left| Minma Sit Nom Noi || M-1 FAIRTEX Muay Thai Challenge “Ganbaro Nippon! RAORAK MUAY vol.2 || Tokyo, Japan || KO  || 4 || 0:25
|-  bgcolor="#fbb"
| 2011-04-12|| Loss ||align=left| Teacher Go. Addison || Rangsit Stadium || Rangsit, Thailand || Decision (Unanimous) || 5 || 2:00
|-
! style=background:white colspan=9 |
|-  bgcolor="#cfc"
| 2011-01-23|| Win ||align=left| Junko Yamada || REBELS.6 || Tokyo, Japan || Decision (Unanimous)  || 5 || 2:00
|-
! style=background:white colspan=9 |
|-  bgcolor="#fbb"
| 2010-12-12|| Loss ||align=left| Mako Yamada || J-GIRLS Women's Festival 2010- "The fighting woman is beautiful" || Tokyo, Japan || Decision (Unanimous)  || 5 || 2:00
|-  bgcolor="#cfc"
| 2010-09-20|| Win ||align=left| Yukari  Sakamoto || J-GIRLS Catch The stone〜10 || Tokyo, Japan || Decision (Unanimous)  || 4 || 3:00
|-  bgcolor="#c5d2ea"
| 2010-07-19|| Draw ||align=left| Hisae Watanabe || REBELS 3 || Tokyo, Japan || Draw (Split) || 3 || 3:00
|-
! style=background:white colspan=9 |
|-  bgcolor="#cfc"
| 2010-05-30|| Win ||align=left| Nong Bua Luke Peary || J-GIRLS Catch The stone〜8 || Tokyo, Japan || Decision (Unanimous)  || 3 || 2:00
|-  bgcolor="#cfc"
| 2009-12-20|| Win ||align=left| Junko  Yamada || J-GIRLS Final Stage 2009 || Tokyo, Japan || Decision (Unanimous)  || 3 || 2:00
|-
! style=background:white colspan=9 |
|-  bgcolor="#cfc"
| 2009-09-27|| Win ||align=left| Mai || J-GIRLS Catch The stone〜4 || Tokyo, Japan || Decision (Unanimous)  || 3 || 2:00
|-
! style=background:white colspan=9 |
|-  bgcolor="#cfc"
| 2009-09-27|| Win ||align=left| Marie Nakanaka || J-GIRLS Catch The stone〜4 || Tokyo, Japan || Decision (Unanimous)  || 3 || 2:00
|-
! style=background:white colspan=9 |
|-  bgcolor="#fbb"
| 2009-07-26|| Loss ||align=left| Junko Yamada || J-GIRLS Champion Festival 2009 || Tokyo, Japan || Decision (Unanimous)  || 3 || 2:00
|-  bgcolor="#fbb"
| 2009-05-31|| Loss ||align=left| Miho || J-GIRLS Catch The stone〜3 || Tokyo, Japan || Decision (Unanimous)  || 3 || 2:00
|-  bgcolor="#fbb"
| 2009-04-05|| Loss ||align=left| Erika Kamimura || J-GIRLS: Catch the Stone 2 || Tokyo, Japan || Decision (Unanimous)  || 3 || 3:00
|-
! style=background:white colspan=9 |
|-  bgcolor="#cfc"
| 2009-01-18|| Win ||align=left| Mayumi || J-GIRLS Catch The stone〜1 || Tokyo, Japan || Decision (Unanimous)  || 3 || 2:00
|-
! style=background:white colspan=9 |
|-  bgcolor="#cfc"
| 2008-11-09|| Win ||align=left| Yuka Okamura || J-GIRLS Final Stage 2008 || Tokyo, Japan || Decision (Unanimous)  || 3 || 2:00
|-
! style=background:white colspan=9 |
|-  bgcolor="#c5d2ea"
| 2008-07-21|| Draw ||align=left| Miho || J-GIRLS Summer Kick Carnival || Tokyo, Japan || Draw (Split) || 3 || 3:00
|-  bgcolor="#fbb"
| 2008-05-25|| Loss ||align=left| Mayumi || J-GIRLS World Queen Tournament 2008 || Tokyo, Japan || Decision (Unanimous)  || 3 || 2:00 
|-
! style=background:white colspan=9 |
|-  bgcolor="#cfc"
| 2008-03-02|| Win ||align=left| Mai || J-GIRLS World Queen Tournament 2008 || Tokyo, Japan || Decision (Unanimous)  || 3 || 2:00 
|-
! style=background:white colspan=9 |
|-  bgcolor="#fbb"
| 2007-12-07|| Loss ||align=left| Chiharu || All Japan Kick Fujiwara Festival -Fujiwara Festival 2007 || Tokyo, Japan || Decision (Unanimous)  || 3 || 2:00
|-  bgcolor="#cfc"
| 2007-10-6|| Win ||align=left| Tomoko Kurimitsu || CUB☆KICK'S-8 || Tokyo, Japan || Decision (Unanimous)  || 3 || 2:00
|-
| colspan=9 | Legend:

See also
 List of female kickboxers

References 

1983 births
People from Taitō
People from Tokyo
Japanese kickboxers
Female Muay Thai practitioners
Living people
Sportspeople from Tokyo
ONE Championship kickboxers